Robert Moore Williams (June 19, 1907 – May 12, 1977) was an American writer, primarily of science fiction. Pseudonyms included John S Browning, H. H. Harmon, Russell Storm and E. K. Jarvis (a house name).

Williams was born in Farmington, Missouri. He graduated from the Missouri School of Journalism in 1931.  His first published story was "Zero as a Limit", which appeared in Astounding Science Fiction in 1937, under the pseudonym of "Robert Moore".  He was a prolific author throughout his career, his last novel appearing in 1972.  His "Jongor" series was originally published in Fantastic Adventures in the 1940s and 1950s, and appeared in book form in 1970. By the 1960s he had published over 150 stories.

Bibliography

Jongor series

Jongor of Lost Land (1940, repub. 1970)
The Return of Jongor (1944, repub. 1970)
Jongor Fights Back! (1951, repub. 1970 w/o exclamation point)

Zanthar series
Zanthar of the Many Worlds (1967)
Zanthar at Moon's Madness (1968)
Zanthar at the Edge of Never (1968)
Zanthar at Trip's End (1969)

Novels
World Beyond the Sky (1943) book length novel published only in Startling Stories (January 1943)
The Chaos Fighters (1955)
Conquest of the Space Sea (1955) bound dos-à-dos with Leigh Brackett's The Galactic Breed
Doomsday Eve (1957) bound dos-à-dos with Eric Frank Russell's Three to Conquer
The Blue Atom (1958) bound dos-à-dos with The Void Beyond and Other Stories
World of the Masterminds (1960)
The Day They H-Bombed Los Angeles (1961)
The Darkness Before Tomorrow (1962)
King of the Fourth Planet (1962)
Walk Up the Sky (1962)
Flight from Yesterday (1963)
The Star Wasps (1963) bound dos-à-dos with Terry Carr's Warlord of Kor
The Lunar Eye (1964)
The Second Atlantis (1965), Ace Books F-335 original paperback 
Vigilante 21st Century (1967)
The Bell From Infinity (1968)
When Two Worlds Meet (1970)
Beachhead Planet (1970)
Now Comes Tomorrow (1971)
Seven Tickets to Hell (1972)

Short Story Collections
The Void Beyond and Other Stories (1958)
To The End of Time and Other Stories (1960)
When Two Worlds Meet: Stories of Men on Mars (1970)
Sinister Paradise and Other Tales from the Pulps (2010)
Time Tolls for Toro and Other Tales (2014)

Selected Short Stories
"Missing: Millions in Radium" (Amazing Stories Dec 1939)
“The Bridge to Earth” (1939)
“Planet of the Gods” (1942)
“The Lost Warship” (1943)
“The Bees of Death” (1949)
“Beyond the Rings of Saturn” (1951)
“Sinister Paradise” (1952)
“Thompson's Cat” (1952)
“The Next Time We Die” (1957)

Non-Fiction
Love Is Forever - We Are For Tonight  (1970) Called a novel on the cover, but really an autobiography

See also
List of novelists from the United States

References

External links
 
 
 
 

1907 births
1977 deaths
20th-century American novelists
American male novelists
American science fiction writers
People from Farmington, Missouri
Novelists from Missouri
American male short story writers
20th-century American short story writers
20th-century American male writers
Missouri School of Journalism alumni